Zahrat al-Mada'en (Flower of the Cities, marketed under its French title La Fleur des Cités) is a 1967 Arabic song performed by Lebanese singer Fairuz, composed by the Rahbani brothers and written by Said Akl.

A somber musical response to the Naksa, its lyrics extol the city of Jerusalem, focusing on the situation of its populace and praying for its future liberation, with a special emphasis on its religiously diverse, multi-confessional history.

The song, one of the first Arabic-language songs to deal with Jerusalem in any detail, was immensely well-received, becoming an instant hit, the most popular of Fairuz's songs about Palestine, and one of the most celebrated songs of the Arab world.

Background 
The Rahbani brothers were known for their early commitment to the Palestinian cause, and Fairuz is celebrated throughout the Arab world for her songs about Palestine, the first of which was the 1957 semi-dramatic Raji'un (We Are Returning), written and composed for Cairo Radio. The Rahbanis' songs for Palestine built on a strong tradition of pre-existing Arab nationalist and pro-Palestinian songs pioneered in Egypt by singers Umm Kulthum and Mohammed Abdel Wahab, which endorsed Gamal Abdel Nasser and frequently featured religious references.

The Arab defeat in the 1967 Six-Day War, however, came as an impactful shock to the Arab world, with the Arab populace being previously led to believe that victory is inevitable, even as Arab armies were suffering defeat after defeat. For the Arab world, the war's disastrous outcome came with several political and cultural ramifications, that Christopher Stone likened to the impact of World War I on Europe. Although it had the short-term effect of temporarily decreasing artistic activity, the defeat ended up causing a cultural renaissance of sorts with disappointment, grief and resolve being expressed in several artistic mediums. One of the quickest artistic responses to the defeat was Zahrat al-Mada'en, which was debuted in Lebanon's Cedars Festival in the very summer of 1967. The song's lyrics were written by poet Said Akl who also wrote Fairuz's songs about Damascus, Mecca and Kuwait among others.

Composition 
Eight minutes in length, Zahrat al-Mada'en is a quintessentially Rahbani song, opening with violins which had become a key ingredient of their songs by the 1960s, and otherwise dominated by strings and martial-sounding brass, a combination which became a trademark of the Rahbanis' nationalistic songs for Palestine.

Melodically, the song alternates between martial music and Byzantine Arab church hymns, with an overarching theme of sobriety and sentimentality juxtaposed with a tone of defiant resistance, all of which are observable in the song's 90-second anthem-like intro. As in the first Rahbani song about Palestine, Raji'un, Fairuz is accompanied throughout the song by a chorus of male and female voices.

Lyrical content 
The song was written in classical Arabic, its title employing for the sake of poetic expediency the relatively rare plural of city, mada'en, which lends an abstraction to Jerusalem's description reinforced throughout the song.

The formality of the song's language is interpreted by Stone as conveying a sense of timelessness augmented by mentions of Jesus, Mary, as well as the city's places of worship. The city is addressed in the second-person with a sense of longing, as if being remembered from a distance, while the predicament of its populace, especially the children made homeless, is dwelt on.

After a melodious melancholy that accompanies lyrics about the weeping of Jesus and Mary, the song's volume, tempo and the resolve of its chorus increases, promising a "blinding rage"  mounted on "awesome steeds", which Stone interprets as an allusion to Saladin's recapture of Jerusalem from the crusaders in 1187. The song ends with prayers for the effacement of the distance between the narrator and Jerusalem through liberation of the city, held to be only be possible through the active resistance of its populace.

Uniquely, the song's lyrics mention the houses of worship of all three Abrahamic faiths, stressing the city of Jerusalem's historical and religious diversity, which Joseph Massad contrasts with Israeli song Jerusalem of Gold, interpreted instead an expression of solely exclusivist, Jewish narratives and Zionist ideology.

Legacy 
A year after the song's release, Fairuz was awarded a key to Jerusalem from the Jerusalem Cultural Committee. This song along with Fairuz's other pro-Palestinian work cemented her status as a champion for the Palestinian cause, with poet Mahmoud Darwish stating that Fairuz and the Rahbani brothers have artistically done more for Palestine than anyone else.

See also 
 Rahbani brothers
 Said Akl
 Mahmoud Darwish
 Jerusalem of Gold

Notes

Footnotes

Citations

Sources 

.
.
.
.
.
.

1967 songs
Arabic-language songs
Fairuz songs
Lebanese songs